Larisa Nazarovna Dodkhudoeva (born 1947) is a Tajikistani art historian.

Biography
Born in Dushanbe, Dodkhudoeva is the daughter of politician Nazarsho Dodkhudoev; her sister Lola is a historian of some repute. She graduated from the Repin Institute in Leningrad in 1970; eight years later she received a doctorate in Islamic culture from the Institute of Oriental Studies of the USSR Academy of Sciences. In 1988 she received another doctorate, this one in history, from the Institute of History, Archaeology and Ethnography of the Tajikistan Academy of Sciences. She began her academic career as a researcher at the Institute in 1970, later rising to become head of the Department of South Asia, the Institute of World Economy and International Relations from 1993 until 1996; from then until 2000 she was Deputy Director of the Institute of World Economy and International Relations. More recently, she has served as Chief Researcher in the Institute of History, Archaeology and Ethnography of the Tajikistan Academy of Sciences, where she has also headed the ethnographic department. During her career, Dodkhudoeva has received recognition from numerous international institutions; in 1999 she was awarded a certificate by the University of Nebraska for involvement in peace and reconciliation in Tajikistan, and in 2001 she received an award from the Central European University for her cultural work. She has also received numerous grants from various entities during her career. She is a past member of the Institute for Advanced Study. Many of her publications deal with Tajik and Islamic art and culture. She has also published work in conjunction with her sister.

Selected writings 

Tajik Artists, Moscow, 1983
Nizami Poems in Medieval Persian Miniature Painting, Moscow, 1985
Catalogue of the Artistically Decorated Manuscripts in the Academy of Sciences of Tajikistan, Dushanbe, 1986
Zoroastrian Elements in Islamic Art and Artifacts, 1997
Art of Books in Central Asia and India in the Sixteenth to Nineteenth Centuries, Dushanbe, 2001
Istaravshan, Moscow, 2002
Tajik Art, Dushanbe, 2002''

Source:

References

1947 births
Living people
Tajikistani art historians
Women art historians
People from Dushanbe
Repin Institute of Arts alumni
20th-century Tajikistani historians
21st-century Tajikistani historians
20th-century Tajikistani women writers
21st-century Tajikistani women writers